Bentonville is an unincorporated community in Jim Wells County, Texas, United States.  It lies on State Highway 44 seven miles (11 km) east of Alice in east central Jim Wells County.

History
A post office established here in 1910 operated until 1932. Bentonville was named for an early settler. By 1914 the community had a population of fifty, two general stores, a cotton gin, and a blacksmith. A stop on the Texas Mexican Railway was also established there that year. By 1936 the town had only scattered dwellings and farm units. In 1949 it had a population of twenty and one business. The population remained constant in the 1950s and 1960s and decreased to fifteen in 1974. In 1979 the community had scattered dwellings, a windmill, an oil well, and was a stop on the Texas Mexican Railway. In 2000, the population was still fifteen.

References

Unincorporated communities in Jim Wells County, Texas
Unincorporated communities in Texas